Imishli is a city and the capital of the Imishli District of Azerbaijan.

History 
During the Tsardom of Russia, Qaradonlu belonged to the Javad Khan administration. In 1906, the first School of Qaradonlu region was established, with many living-buildings, caravanserais, mills and shops in the area.  In August 1930, Qaradonlu was organized in Mil-Mugan as a region. As early as the October Revolution, land-reclamation and irrigation work were made based on the intense irrigated plant-growing. 

In 1933, Qaradonlu Machine-Tractor Plant was built in the Qaradonlu historical region. As a result of the construction of the railway between Ələt and Yerevan, people moved from the center of the region to suburbs of the railway stations. The population increase produced two-story brick buildings in Qaradonlu and Imishli. The regional capital was moved there and the region became Imishli District. Imishli village also expanded. Government houses were constructed, completely transforming the village's appearance. 

In 1944, Imishli was awarded status of town-type settlement, progressing to city status in the 1960s. In 1959, on the Aras River in the Bəhramtəpə area, water storage was used - which was unique in that time period.

Outstanding people 
 Prof.Dr. Vusal Gasimli, Executive Director of the Center for Analyses of Economic Reforms and Communication of the Republic of Azerbaijan.

Infrastructure 
The Qaradonlu region is situated in a favorable area near the Aras River providing water resources, productive land and caravan roads. The Bash Mugam and Azizbaiov irrigation canals provide water to the land area of Imishli and to land areas of Bilasuvar District and Saatly District.

Culture

Sports 
The city has one professional football team, Mil-Muğan, currently competing in the second-flight of Azerbaijani football, the Azerbaijan First Division.

Gallery

References

External links 

Location map, World and City Maps

Populated places in Imishli District